Local elections were held in Manila on May 10, 2004, within the Philippine general election. The voters  elected  the elective local posts in the city: the mayor, vice mayor, the six Congressmen, and the councilors, six in each of the city's six legislative districts.

References 

2004 Philippine local elections
Elections in Manila
Politics of Manila
2004 elections in Metro Manila